Yengi Kand (also Romanized as 'Yengī Kand; also known as Yengī Kandī) is a village in Qaranqu Rural District, in the Central District of Hashtrud County, East Azerbaijan Province, Iran. At the 2006 census, its population was 55, in 11 families.

References 

Towns and villages in Hashtrud County